KUBE (1350 kHz) is an AM radio station broadcasting a sports format. Licensed to Pueblo, Colorado, United States, it serves the Colorado Springs area. The station is currently owned by iHeartMedia, Inc. and licensed as CC Licenses.

History
This station was authorized to Philip C. Lasky and J. H. Albert on October 27, 1927, as KGHF. It originally broadcast on 1430 kHz, sharing the frequency with KFXJ. It went on the air in January 1928 from the Congress Hotel.

In 1964, KGHF became KKAM. KKAM would eventually become country KIDN and later return to its KGHF callsign.

KDZA (1230 AM), Pueblo's heritage Top 40 radio station and once this frequency's competitor when 1350 was KKAM, was shut down in the early 1990s and was sold to Pueblo Community College a few years later, which dropped the legendary call letters for KKPC. KKPC was later sold to Colorado Public Radio. The KDZA call sign was picked up for a Pueblo-based FM oldies station at 107.9 and the station remained a success. When KDZA-FM adopted the Jet 107.9 moniker along with a move towards '70s based hits along with a focus on the Colorado Springs area; current owner Clear Channel decided to revive the KDZA call sign on the signal of its former competitor, AM 1350, by dropping the sports talk format on AM 1350. In late July 2009, the station went back to the sports format. On April 3, 2012, KDZA changed its callsign to KCCY. On April 13, 2012, KCCY changed formats from sports to classic country.

On May 22, 2013, KCCY changed formats back to sports, branded as "Fox Sports 1350". The station changed its call sign to KBPL on January 16, 2018, and back to KDZA on January 23, 2018.

On May 12, 2022, KDZA changed callsigns to KUBE as part of a warehousing move of the call letters that were formerly carried on a sister station in Seattle, Washington.

References

External links

UBE (AM)
Radio stations established in 1928
1928 establishments in Colorado
IHeartMedia radio stations
Fox Sports Radio stations